Mill Springs National Cemetery is a United States National Cemetery located in the town of Nancy, eight miles (13 km) west of the city of Somerset in Pulaski County, Kentucky. Administered by the United States Department of Veterans Affairs, it encompasses , and as of 2014, has over 4,000 interments.

History

The site of Mill Springs National Cemetery was originally the battlefield cemetery of the Battle of Mill Springs, Sunday 19 January 1862, initially designated Logan's Cross Roads Cemetery. Soldiers who fell in the battle were buried in large trenches. After the Civil War, it became an official National Cemetery and had its name changed. Many battlefield cemeteries in the region had their remains transferred to Mill Springs.

In 1867, additional land was donated to the federal government for the cemetery by William H. Logan; he and his wife were buried in the cemetery upon their deaths.

Mill Springs National Cemetery was listed in the National Register of Historic Places in 1998.

Mill Springs National Cemetery was on the list of the first National Cemeteries created. As small as it is, the cemetery still receives burials. It is one of the  oldest  National Cemeteries still in operation.

Notable interments

 Sergeant Brent Woods (1850–1906), Medal of Honor recipient for action in New Mexico Territory during the Indian Wars.

External links

 National Cemetery Administration
 Mill Springs National Cemetery
 
 
 

Cemeteries on the National Register of Historic Places in Kentucky
United States national cemeteries
National Register of Historic Places in Pulaski County, Kentucky
Protected areas of Pulaski County, Kentucky
Historic American Landscapes Survey in Kentucky
National Cemetery
American Civil War on the National Register of Historic Places